Sadri Ferati (born 10 June 1957) is a politician in Kosovo. He was minister of local government in the Government of Kosovo from 2008 to 2010 and served in the Assembly of Kosovo from 2011 to 2017. Ferati is a member of the Democratic League of Kosovo (Lidhja Demokratike e Kosovës, LDK).

Early life and career
Ferati was born in Kosovska Mitrovica, in what was then the Autonomous Region of Kosovo and Metohija in the People's Republic of Serbia, People's Federal Republic of Yugoslavia. He holds a bachelor's degree from the University of Pristina in mining and metallurgy and has worked in the private sector and for state institutions.

Politician
During the 1990s, most members of the Kosovo Albanian community boycotted Serbian state institutions and participated in parallel governing structures. Ferati served as a member of the "parallel" Assembly of Kosovo during this time. He was later a LDK candidate in the 2004 Kosovan parliamentary election but was not elected.

Ferati became chief executive officer in the local administration of the predominantly Albanian southern part of Mitrovica in 2005. Two years later, he responded negatively to the Ahtisaari Plan for self-rule in Kosovo, saying that full independence was inevitable and could take the form of a unilateral declaration. 

He ran for mayor of Mitrovica in the 2007 Kosovan local elections and was defeated in the second round by Bajram Rexhepi of the Democratic Party of Kosovo (Partia Demokratike e Kosovës, PDK).

Government Minister
The 2007 Kosovan parliamentary election (which was held concurrently with the local vote) led to a coalition government of the PDK and LDK. On 9 January 2008, Ferati was appointed as minister of local government in the new administration.

Ferati's main goal as minister was enacting a policy of decentralization, and much of his attention was devoted to the re-integration of Kosovo's Serb community into the political institutions of the Pristina government. Shortly before Kosovo's unilateral declaration of independence in February 2008, he made a ministerial visit to Babin Most in Obilić to meet with Serb returnees who indicated their willingness to remain in an independent state. He pledged that his government would ensure the safety of Serb returnees to Kosovo. Ferati also supported the efforts of displaced Albanians to return to their homes into the predominantly Serb northern part of Mitrovica.

Following Kosovo's declaration of independence, the Serbian government held its own parallel local elections in Kosovo in May 2008. Ferati indicated that Kosovo's government would not recognize the results or co-operate with the elected officials. He was quoted as saying, "Serbia will never establish its institutions in Kosovo; Serbian laws will not be implemented in Kosovo. We are offering an opportunity for everyone to be equal, for everyone to perceive the state and its institutions as something that belongs to all of you, to all Kosovans."

Kosovo's decentralization initiative began in June 2008, with Ferati overseeing the creation of the municipalities of Junik, Elez Han, and Mamusha (the latter being the only municipality in Kosovo with a Turkish majority). He subsequently oversaw the creation of a number of predominantly Serb municipalities, including Klokot, Gračanica, Ranilug, and Parteš; he also worked toward the creation of a  North Mitrovica municipality. Ferati indicated that the end goal was for Kosovo to have thirty-eight municipalities, of which twenty-seven would be predominantly Albanian, ten predominantly Serb, and one with a Turkish majority. In August 2009, he said that the Serb municipalities would have significant autonomy and would provide Serbs with a "state within the state of Kosovo."

Ferati urged Serbs to participate in the 2009 Kosovan local elections. After the vote, he welcomed the election of Serb mayors who pledged to work within Kosovo's institutions. In June 2010, he described a high Serb turnout in the election to establish the new Parteš municipality as encouraging.

In a 2010 interview, Ferati said that a "one city with two municipalities" model was the only viable solution to the situation in Mitrovica.

Although the decentralization plan was supported by some in the Serb community, it was not endorsed by the Serbian government and did not lead to a breakthrough in Priština's relations with the predominantly Serb municipalities in Kosovo's north. The plan was also opposed by the Kosovo Albanian Vetëvendosje party, which argued that it would lead to the "ethnic division" of Kosovo. During this period, Vetëvendosje used the slogan, "Decentralization Means Partition - Partition Means War."

In addition to his main responsibilities, Ferati was appointed to a ministerial committee overseeing the privatization of Post and Telecommunications of Kosovo in late 2008. In 2010, he represented the Kosovo government in signing cross-border co-operation treaties with Albania and the Republic of Macedonia (now North Macedonia).

The LDK withdrew from Kosovo's coalition government in October 2010, bringing Ferati's ministerial tenure to an end.

Assembly member
Ferati appeared on the LDK's coalition electoral list in the 2010 Kosovan parliamentary election, which was held under open list proportional representation. He finished in twentieth place among the coalition's candidates and was elected when the list won twenty-seven seats. The PDK won the election, and the LDK served in opposition in the following term. Ferati served on the assembly committee that oversaw local government issues.

He rejected the notion that the status of Kosovo could be settled by partition in May 2011, describing the suggestion as "primitive and dangerous." He later expressed skepticism about the government's plan to open an administrative office in the north of Kosovo, saying that existing conditions could not guarantee its success and that a lack of co-operation from Serbs would simply strengthen the community's parallel institutions.

Ferati often spoke for the LDK on the negotiations that led to the 2013 Brussels Agreement, which normalized some aspects of the relationship between Belgrade and Pristina without addressing the status of Kosovo. After the agreement was signed, Serbs in the north of Kosovo generally began engaging with the Pristina authorities again; Ferati spoke favourably of the creation of the Community of Serb Municipalities envisioned by the agreement. Within the local government committee, he helped design amendments to ensure the Serb association would function in conformity with Kosovo's law on local administration and to register the association as a non-governmental organization. (The amendments were not voted on due to the dissolution of the assembly and were subsequently met with opposition from the Serb List.)

In the 2014 Kosovan parliamentary election, Ferati finished twenty-second among LDK candidates and was re-elected when the party's list won thirty mandates. After extended negotiations, the PDK formed a new coalition government with the LDK, and Ferati served as a government supporter. In this term, he was deputy chair of the assembly committee overseeing local administration.

Ferati's assembly tenure ended in 2017; he finished thirty-sixth among LDK candidates in that year's election and was not returned when the list fell to twenty-nine seats. 

In a 2021 interview, Ferati said that the LDK had been stagnating for a number of years and called for renewal within the party.

Electoral record

Local

Notes

References

1957 births
Living people
People from Mitrovica, Kosovo
Kosovo Albanians
Government ministers of Kosovo
Members of the Assembly of Kosovo (1990s parallel institution)
Members of the Assembly of the Republic of Kosovo
Democratic League of Kosovo politicians